Francis Joseph Barrett (July 1, 1913 – March 6, 1998) was an American baseball player. He was a relief pitcher for the St. Louis Cardinals, Boston Red Sox, Boston Braves, and Pittsburgh Pirates.

In five seasons, Barrett had a win–loss record of 15–17 in 104 games, two of them starts. He finished 67 games, compiling 12 saves, 217 innings pitched, 211 hits allowed, 100 runs allowed, 85 earned runs allowed, 8 home runs allowed, 90 walks, 90 strikeouts, 8 wild pitches, 924 batters faced and a 3.51 ERA.

Afterwards, Barrett coached and managed n the Minor Leagues.

Sources

External links

, or Reetrosheet, or Historic Baseball

1913 births
1998 deaths
Albany Travelers players
Baseball players from Fort Lauderdale, Florida
Boston Braves players
Boston Red Sox players
Burlington Bees players
Butler Tigers players
Columbus Jets players
Columbus Red Birds players
Houston Buffaloes players
Huntington Red Birds players
Indianapolis Indians players
Major League Baseball pitchers
Mayfield Clothiers players
Minor league baseball coaches
Minor league baseball managers
Mobile Shippers players
New Orleans Pelicans (baseball) players
Pittsburgh Pirates players
Rochester Red Wings players
Saint Leo Lions baseball players
St. Louis Cardinals players
Union Springs Springers players
Baseball coaches from Florida